The following is a timeline of the history of the city of Lübeck, Schleswig-Holstein, Germany.

Prior to 13th century

 1138 – Town sacked.
 1143 – New town founded by Adolf II of Holstein near site of old town.
 1158 – Town ceded by Adolf II of Holstein to Duke Henry the Lion of Saxony.
 1160 – Seat of Catholic diocese of Lübeck relocated to Lübeck from Oldenburg in Holstein.
 1173 – Lübeck Cathedral construction begins.
 1177 – Benedictine  founded.
 1188 – Town charter issued by Henry the Lion.

13th–15th centuries

 1201 – Danes in power.
 1210 – Lübeck Cathedral construction completed (approximate date).
 1226 – Lübeck becomes an Imperial Free City.
 1250 –  (church) built.
 1310 – Marienkirche (church) built (approximate date).
 1312 –  founded.
 1356 – St. Catherine's Church built (approximate date).
 1368 – Hanseatic League adopts Lübeck's city seal.
 1379 – Circle Company founded.
 1408 – Uprising.
 1420 - Paper mill established.
 1442 –  built.
 1444 – Burgtor (city gate) built.
 1450 – Merchants Company founded (approximate date).
 1462 –  becomes mayor.
 1463 – Bernt Notke creates Dance of Death artwork for the Marienkirche.
 1475 - Printing press in operation.
 1477
 Crucifix created by Bernt Notke erected in Lübeck Cathedral.
 Holstentor (city gate) built.
 1491 – Artist Hans Memling creates triptych for the Lübeck Cathedral.

16th–18th centuries
 1515 – St. Anne's Priory built.
 1530 – Protestant reformation.
 1531 – Katharineum (school) opens.
 1533 – Jürgen Wullenwever becomes mayor.
 1535 – Shipowners' Guild house built.
 1586 – Outer Holstentor (city gate) built.
 1630 – Last Hanseatic Diet meets at Lübeck.
 1668 – Dieterich Buxtehude becomes organist at the Marienkirche.
 1697 – Buthman's Bierstube (tavern) in business.
 1793 – Gesellschaft zur Beförderung gemeinnütziger Tätigkeit (charitable society) established.

19th century

 1801 – City "temporarily occupied" by Danes.
 1802 – Town walls dismantled.
 1806 – 6 November: City captured by French forces.
 1810 – 12 November: City becomes part of the French Empire.
 1813 – French occupation ends.
 1815 
 Recognized as a free city by the Congress of Vienna.
 Joins the German Confederation.
 1825 – Navigation School founded.
 1832 – Lübecker General-Anzeiger newspaper begins publication.
 1835 –  (newspaper) in publication.
 1851 – Population: town 26,093; territory 54,166.
 1857 - Population: town 30,717; territory 49,324.
 1866 – Joins the North German Confederation.
 1867 – Wilhelm-Theater opens.
 1868
 Joins the German Customs Union.
 Schiffergesellschaft (restaurant) in operation.
 1871 – Joins the German Empire.
 1874 –  (church) restored.
 1875 – Population: 44,799.
 1890 – Population: town 63,590; territory 76,485.
 1891 – Sacred Heart Church consecrated.
 1893 –  built.
 1900 – Elbe-Trave canal opens.

20th century

 1904 – City Theatre opens.
 1905 – Population: town 91,541; state 105,857.
 1915 – St. Anne's Museum opens.
 1917 – Lübeck Airport constructed.
 1919
 Lübeck joins the Weimar Republic.
 Ballsportverein Vorwärts Lübeck (sport club) formed.
 Population: town 113,071.
 1921 – Sportvereinigung Polizei Lübeck (sport club) formed.
 1924 – Stadion an der Lohmühle (stadium) opens.
 1937 – The Greater Hamburg Act merges Lübeck into the Prussian Province of Schleswig-Holstein and it loses its status as an independent free city.
 1940 – Oflag X-C prisoner-of-war camp for Allied officers established.
 1942 – Bombing of Lübeck in World War II.
 1945
 2 May: City captured by British forces. Oflag X-C POW camp liberated.
 VfB Lübeck sport club formed.
 1946 - Lübecker Nachrichten and Lübecker Freie Presse newspapers begin publication.
 1948 – Lübecker Kantorei (choir) founded.
 1973 – Lübeck Academy of Music founded.
 1982
 Lübeck Museum of Theatre Puppets established.
 Lübeck Cathedral reconstructed.
 1987 – City centre becomes a UNESCO World Heritage Site.
 2000 –  becomes mayor.

21st century

 2001 – International School of New Media established.
 2005 – Herren Tunnel opens.
 2012 – Population: 211,713.

See also
 Lübeck history
  (includes timeline)

References

This article incorporates information from the German Wikipedia.

Bibliography

in English

in German

External links

 Links to fulltext city directories for Lubeck via Wikisource
 Europeana. Items related to Lübeck, various dates.
 Digital Public Library of America. Items related to Lübeck, various dates

 
Lubeck
lubeck
Years in Germany